GA3 may refer to:
 George Atkinson III (1992–2019), American football player
 Georgia's 3rd congressional district, a congressional district in the U.S. state of Georgia
 Georgia State Route 3, a north–south highway in the U.S. state of Georgia
 GA3, Gibberellic acid, a form of the gibberellin plant hormone
 Trumpchi GA3, a 2013–2019 Chinese subcompact sedan